Fragaria is an unincorporated community in Kitsap County, Washington, United States.

A post office called Fragaria was established in 1911, and remained in operation until 1955. The community was named for the local cultivation of strawberries (scientific name: Fragaria).

References

External links
Fragaria Community Website
Kitsap County official website
Kitsap Peninsula Visitor and Convention Bureau
Kitsap Economic Development Alliance
The Steamer Virginia V Foundation

Unincorporated communities in Kitsap County, Washington
Unincorporated communities in Washington (state)
Landforms of Puget Sound